Bird Nest Roys is an EP by the New Zealand band Bird Nest Roys, released in 1985.

Production
The EP was produced by Chris Sheehan at Progressive Studios.

Critical reception
Spin praised the guitar sound, calling it "clean and clear as if it were acoustic," and writing that it "runs through mod-edged surfisms and jingly-strummed janglies."

Track listing
Side A
Ain't Mutatin'''BatcaveSide BSevered DaysCrestaWomcat Stones''

Personnel
Deberly Roy (bass)
Peter Moerenhout (drums)
Dominic Stones (guitar)
Big Ross (guitar, vocals)
Warro Wakefield (tambourine, backing vocals)
Little Ross (vocals)

References

Bird Nest Roys albums
Flying Nun Records albums
1985 EPs